Viken may refer to:
Viken, Scandinavia, a historical region
Viken (county), a Norwegian county established in 2020
Viken, Sweden, a bimunicipal locality in Skåne County, Sweden
Viken (lake), a lake in Sweden, part of the part of the Göta canal
IF Viken, a Swedish association football team
Viken (given name)
Viken (surname)
Vestre Viken Hospital Trust, a health trust in Norway

See also
Vigen (disambiguation)